The Massacre (also known as The Massacre of St Bartholomew's Eve) is the completely missing fifth serial of the third season in the British science fiction television series Doctor Who, which was first broadcast in four weekly parts from 5 to 26 February 1966.

In this serial, the Doctor (William Hartnell) and his travelling companion Steven (Peter Purves) arrive in France in 1572, during the events leading up to the St. Bartholomew's Day massacre. The two of them become separated, leaving the Doctor's journey largely unaccounted for, while Steven is caught up in a Huguenot plot to assassinate the Catholic Queen Mother Catherine de' Medici (Joan Young).

This serial marks the first appearance of Jackie Lane as companion-to-be Dodo Chaplet. It is also notable for being the first time the lead actor (Hartnell) played a dual role as the Doctor and the villain (i.e. as the First Doctor and the Abbot of Amboise), although unlike future instances, they never met on-screen. Although audio recordings and production stills of the story exist, no footage of this serial is known to have survived.

Plot

The arrival of the TARDIS in Paris, France in 1572 places its occupants, the First Doctor and Steven, in a dangerous situation. Tensions between the Protestant Huguenots and Catholics are at fever pitch in the city. Despite the danger, the Doctor heads off alone to visit the apothecary Charles Preslin, leaving Steven alone. Steven enters a tavern and meets Nicholas Muss, a Huguenot. When the Doctor does not return as arranged, Steven decides to spend the night at the home of his new friend. While Steven and Nicholas are wandering home, they find a frightened serving girl, Anne Chaplet. Anne is terrified because she has overheard some Catholic guards speaking of a coming religious massacre of Huguenots here in Paris. To protect her and her knowledge, Nicholas arranges for Anne to go into the service of his master, Admiral Gaspard de Coligny.

The next day, the Abbot of Amboise arrives at his Parisian residence. Convinced that Anne has discovered the threat to the Protestants, the Abbot sends his secretary Colbert to find her. Steven sees the two talking, and becomes convinced that the Abbot is the Doctor in disguise. He tries to track down Preslin, the apothecary the Doctor went to meet, but learns he was arrested two years ago for heresy. He heads to the Abbot's house to wait for the Doctor. While hidden he overhears Colbert and an assassin plotting to kill someone they call "the sea beggar" tomorrow. As night falls, Steven heads out and finds Anne following him. They hide for the night at Preslin's empty shop, planning to search for the identity of the sea beggar. They call upon the Abbot, but are forced to flee after Steven realises that the Abbot is not the Doctor.

Anne and Steven meet back at Preslin's shop after the Abbot is killed, and a little later the Doctor himself arrives. After Anne tells the Doctor what day it is, he is very insistent that he and Steven must depart the city as soon as possible. He sends Anne to her aunt’s house, warning her that she must stay there. Steven and the Doctor then head across the city. They make it to the TARDIS just as the curfew is falling and depart as the massacre begins. Steven is worried for Anne and his friends, and angry that the Doctor made him leave. The Doctor insists that history could not be changed. Steven cannot accept that the Doctor left Anne behind, and is so disgusted with his colleague that he determines to leave his company. When the TARDIS lands in 1966 on Wimbledon Common, Steven offers a terse goodbye and ventures outside. The Doctor is left totally alone for the first time, and reflects on the other companions that have travelled with him and then left him, and his inability to return home. A young girl mistakes the TARDIS for a Police Box and enters to report a road accident. Steven comes in too, saying that policemen are approaching, and his heart softens when the young woman introduces herself as Dorothea or Dodo Chaplet.

The Doctor, hearing Steven's warning of the approaching policemen, hurriedly dematerialises the TARDIS, not noticing until after it has left 1966 that Dodo is still aboard. Steven informs her that there's no way back, and "we could land anywhere", but Dodo seems either unworried or simply not to believe him. She says she is an orphan who lives with her great-aunt and thus has few ties, as the TARDIS continues to hum, hurtling them toward the next great adventure.

Production
Script editor Donald Tosh rewrote much of the script delivered by John Lucarotti. In a monograph on The Massacre, James Cooray Smith argues that the Doctor's similarity with the Abbot of Amboise was inspired by a real historical event, the impersonation in 1562 of the Abbot responsible for Marmoutier Abbey in the commune of Amboise by a man called Chastillon, who was later executed. He suggests that Lucarotti's original script (which no longer exists) involved the Doctor extensively impersonating the Abbot with the audience's connivance, whereas Tosh's preference was for the audience to be left unsure whether or not the Abbot was really the Doctor, leading to the disagreements between the two. There are conflicting accounts as to whether Lucarotti's name was removed from the credits at his request. Tosh is credited with co-writing the final episode, on which incoming script editor Gerry Davis was credited as script editor in his place.

According to the book Doctor Who: Companions by David J. Howe and Mark Stammers, the final episode of the serial was to have included a cameo appearance by William Russell and Jacqueline Hill reprising their roles as former companions Ian Chesterton and Barbara Wright. The scene had Ian and Barbara witnessing the dematerialisation of the TARDIS after Dodo enters. Although the scene was scheduled, it was cancelled at short notice and never filmed.

All four episodes are missing from the BBC Archives. Only behind-the-scenes photographs survive as a visual reference to the original production, for John Wiles opted not to utilise John Cura's tele-snap services during his tenure as producer. Many of the key visual elements, such as Hartnell's costume for the Abbot, are now lost.

Alternative titles
Original production documents state the name of the serial as The Massacre of St Bartholomew's Eve, although this is an anachronism, as the actual massacre took place on St Bartholomew's Day.

The BBC Radio Collection release gives the title as, variously, The Massacre and The Massacre of St Bartholomew's Eve. The packaging uses the title The Massacre, but the accompanying booklet uses both titles. The CDs have The Massacre of St Bartholomew's Eve printed on them and this is also the title announced by Peter Purves on the discs themselves.

Cast notes
William Hartnell was on holiday during filming of episode two; the Doctor does not feature in the episode, and the Abbot appears in a pre-filmed scene only.

Leonard Sachs later played Borusa in Arc of Infinity (1983). Michael Bilton later played Collins in Pyramids of Mars (1975) and a Time Lord in The Deadly Assassin (1976). Christopher Tranchell later played Jenkins in The Faceless Ones (1967) and Commander Andred in The Invasion of Time (1978). David Weston later played Biroc in Warriors' Gate (1981).

Broadcast and reception

 Episode is missing

In 2018, The Daily Telegraph ranked The Massacre at number 10 in "the 56 greatest stories and episodes", stating that it "fulfils" the programme's educational remit at the time and "pulls no punches: the story is more like a standard adult costume drama than Saturday teatime children's TV." It concluded that the Doctor's monologue at the end was "one of Hartnell's finest moments in the role". Patrick Mulkern of Radio Times awarded it four stars out of five, writing that "the surviving soundtrack indicates – and older fan friends assure me – that The Massacre was an outstanding drama, offering novelty and grim realism." He stated that Peter Purves "acquits himself admirably" and was "among a strong cast", but regarded Dodo as "surely one of most ineptly conceived companions". He also praised the ending to the story, describing it as "a profoundly sorrowful moment, pulled off magnificently by Hartnell". In Doctor Who: The Complete Guide, Mark Campbell awarded it nine out of ten, describing it as a "complex and engagingly downbeat historical, with Steven allowed to dominate proceedings for once".

Commercial releases

In print

John Lucarotti's 1987 novelisation of this serial for Target Books, entitled simply The Massacre, returned the story to a previous draft before both a scheduled holiday for Hartnell and technical limitations forced a number of rewrites (allowing Hartnell to not have to be present during recording of the second episode and removing the need for Hartnell to be doubled throughout the story).

Home media
This is one of only three stories – the others being Marco Polo and Mission to the Unknown – of which no footage survives. However, a fan-recorded soundtrack, with linking narration provided by Peter Purves, was released by the BBC Radio Collection on both audio CD and cassette in 1999. The soundtrack, again with the Purves narration, was made available on vinyl on 29 August 2020 to coincide with Record Store Day.

Charles Norton, director of several animated reconstructions, noted in 2019 that an animated version of historics such as The Massacre of St Bartholomew's Eve was unlikely in the near future due to the significant resources required, such as costumes and characters.

Critical analysis 
A book-length study of the serial, written by James Cooray Smith, was published as part of The Black Archive series from Obverse Books in 2016.

The serial was covered in number 7 of the Doctor Who: The Complete History book series, which reprinted Andrew Pixley's Archive features from Doctor Who Magazine and the various Doctor Who Magazine Special Editions, as well as new articles created specifically for the book.

References

Further reading

External links

First Doctor serials
Doctor Who missing episodes
Doctor Who historical serials
Doctor Who serials novelised by John Lucarotti
1966 British television episodes
Fiction set in 1572
Television episodes set in Paris
Television episodes set in the 16th century
Cultural depictions of Catherine de' Medici